Gonystylus keithii is a species of plant in the family Thymelaeaceae. It is found in Indonesia and Malaysia.

References

keithii
Vulnerable plants
Taxonomy articles created by Polbot